Antonina Kłoskowska (7 November 1919, Piotrków Trybunalski – 12 July 2001, Warsaw), was a Polish sociologist. In her work, she focused on the sociology of culture.
Kłoskowska taught at the universities Łódź (1966-1977) and Warsaw (1977-1990). She was a member of the Polish Academy of Sciences (PAN) since 1973 and worked in its Institute for Political Studies since 1990. Since 1983, she edited the journal Kultura i Społeczeństwo. From 1989 until 1993, she was the president of the Polish Sociological Association.
With Władysław Markiewicz and others, Kłoskowska co-edited a multi-volume Polish complete edition of Bronisław Malinowski's works which appeared 1984-1990.

Works 
1954: Machiavelli jako humanista na tle włoskiego odrodzenia. [ Machiavelli as a humanist in the context of the Italian Renaissance]. Łódź: Zakład im. Ossolińskich we Wrocławiu [?].
1964: Kultura masowa. Krytyka i obrona [Mass culture: Critique and defence]. 2nd edition, Warszawa: Państwowe Wydawnictwo Naukowe. 
1969: Z historii i socjologii kultury [On the history and sociology of culture]
1972: Społeczne ramy kultury [The social framework of culture]
1977 (ed. with Guido Martinotti): Education in a changing society. London: 1977. 
1981: Socjologia kultury [Sociology of culture]. Warszawa: Państwowe Wydawnictwo Naukowe. 
1983: (et al., eds.) Naród, kultura, osobowość: księga poświęcona Profesorowi Józefowi Chałasińskiemu [Nation, culture, personality: Festschrift for Professor Józef Chałasiński]. Wrocław: Zakład im. Ossolińskich. 
1990 (ed.): Oblicza polskości [The face of Polishness]. Warszawa: Uniwersytet Warszawski, Program Badań i Współtworzenia Filozofii Pokoju.
1991 (ed.): Encyklopedia kultury polskiej XX wieku (tom 1): pojęcia i problemy wiedzy o kulturze [The encyclopedia of Polish culture in the 20th century (vol. 1): Concepts and problems of the knowledge about culture].  Wrocław: Wiedza o Kulturze.   
1994 (ed. with Richard Grathoff): The neighbourhood of cultures. Warszawa: Instytut Studiów Politycznych PAN.  
1996: Kultury narodowe u korzeni Warszawa: Państwowe Wydawnictwo Naukowe.  English translation 2001: National cultures at the grass-root level. Budapest/New York: Central European University Press. 

Polish sociologists
Polish women sociologists
1919 births
2001 deaths
Polish women academics
University of Łódź alumni
Recipient of the Meritorious Activist of Culture badge